The Prout is an obsolete unit of energy, whose value is:

This is equal to one twelfth of the binding energy of the deuteron.

Units of energy
Obsolete units of measurement